This is a list of notable disc ultimate players

Buzzy Hellring
Robert L. "Nob" Rauch
Joel Silver
Ken Westerfield (1947 - ) (US/Can) Hall of Fame and 1987 National Ultimate Champion, Canada
Abigail Howard
Rebecca Hardie

References

List